iMac is a line of Apple Macintosh computers.  

IMAC or Imac may also refer to:
 iMac (Intel-based), the Intel line of the iMac
 iMac (Apple silicon), the Apple silicon iMac 
 Necmettin Imac (born 1987), Netherlands footballer
 Immobilized metal ion affinity chromatography, a technique to purify proteins
 Independent Medicare Advisory Council, intended to monitor health care in the United States
Independent Monitoring Association for Child Labor (IMAC), who monitor child labour in the football-making industry under the Atlanta Agreement
 International Miniature Aerobatic Club, a non-profit organization devoted to miniature aircraft in Northern America
 Install-Move-Add-Change, in IT Service Management
 I Marine Amphibious Corps, a former military formation of the United States Marine Corps during the Second World War
 International Movement of the Apostolate of Children, a Catholic organization, also known as MIDADE (Mouvement International d’Apostolat des Enfants) - and related to the Dicastery for the Laity, Family and Life (former Pontifical Council for the Laity) of the Vatican
 Isochronous media access controller, a method of transferring data that must not be interrupted (telecommunications).